Megacraspedus arnaldi is a moth of the family Gelechiidae. It is found in Libya.

References

Moths described in 1930
Megacraspedus